Mr. Green may refer to:
Mr. Green (Clue), is the character in the game of Cluedo/Clue
Mr. Green Jeans, Hugh Brannum's role on the children's television show Captain Kangaroo
Mr. Green (record producer), an American Disc jockey and hip hop record producer
Mr Green (company), an online gambling company
Mr. Green Tea Ice Cream Company, a food production company based in Brooklyn, New York City
SoBe Mr. Green, a former brand of carbonated soda drink
Mr green,the founding father of salem academy